The 30th Army Corps was an Army corps in the Imperial Russian Army.

Part of
11th Army: 1914 - 1915
9th Army: 1915
8th Army: 1915 - 1916
Russian Special Army: 1916
4th Army: 1916 - 1917

Commanders
1915-1916: Andrei Zayonchkovski

Reference 

Corps of the Russian Empire